Patrick Nunatak is a nunatak 3.5 nautical miles (6 km) southeast of Gambacorta Peak in southern Neptune Range, Pensacola Mountains.

It was mapped by the United States Geological Survey (USGS) from surveys and U.S. Navy air photos, in 1956–66. It was named by the Advisory Committee on Antarctic Names (US-ACAN) for Frank M. Patrick, aerographer at Ellsworth Station, in winter 1958.

vg

Nunataks of Queen Elizabeth Land